Les Beaux Dimanches was a long-running Canadian television series, which aired on Télévision de Radio-Canada on Sunday nights from 1966 to 2004. An arts magazine and anthology series, Les Beaux Dimanches presented a diverse array of special cultural presentations, including theatrical plays, musical concerts, entertainment variety specials, film screenings and documentary specials on arts and cultural figures.

The series debuted on September 11, 1966, and was hosted by Henri Bergeron until 1983.

The final episode aired on August 8, 2004, and its timeslot was taken over by the talk show Tout le monde en parle.

References

1966 Canadian television series debuts
2004 Canadian television series endings
Ici Radio-Canada Télé original programming
1960s Canadian variety television series
1970s Canadian variety television series
1980s Canadian variety television series
1990s Canadian variety television series
2000s Canadian variety television series